天馬 (literally, heaven horse) may refer to:

 Tianma (disambiguation), Mandarin-language (ㄊㄧㄢ ㄇㄚˇ) and P.R.Chinese (天马) topics
 Chonma (disambiguation) (천마), North Korean topics
 Cheonma (disambiguation) (천마), South Korean topics
 Tenma (disambiguation) (てんま), Japanese topics

See also

 
 
 天
 馬
 Pegasus (disambiguation)
 Flying horses (disambiguation)
 Winged horse (disambiguation)